Giant's Tank (Yōdha Væva) is an irrigation tank in northern Sri Lanka, approximately  south east of Mannar.

History
Some historians have speculated that Giant's Tank is the same as the Mahanama Matha Vapi tank built by King Dhatusena in the fifth century and restored by King Parakramabahu I in the twelfth century. On the other hand, Mudaliyar C. Rajanayagam in his book Ancient Jaffna suggests that the tank was probably constructed by the Nagas. Rajanayagam has suggested that the Megisba lake mentioned by Pliny in Description of Taprobane was in fact Giant's Tank.

Consideration was given to renovating the tank during Dutch Governor Willem Jacob van de Graaf's administration in the eighteenth century but nothing happened. Restoration did however begin in the 1880s following a motion in the Legislative Council by P. Ramanathan. Delays by epidemics and other issues meant that restoration wasn't completed until November 1902. The waters were then diverted to Giant's Tank by a  inlet channel (alawakkai). The name Giant's Tank was the English translation of the local name for the tank - Sodayan Kattu Karai (giant built embankment). The tank is now known as Kattukarai Kulam in Tamil.

Responsibility for the tank passed from the Public Works Department to the Department of Irrigation in 1900. There was a  channel flow spill on the right bank and seven sluices.

The tank's height was  but it was capable of holding  safely.

References

Irrigation tanks in Sri Lanka
Bodies of water of Mannar District
Lakes of Sri Lanka